Alter may refer to:

 Alter (name), people named Alter
 Alter (automobile)
 Alter (crater), a lunar crater
 Alter Channel, a Greek TV channel
 Archbishop Alter High School, a Roman Catholic high school in Kettering, Ohio
 ALTER, a command in older implementations of COBOL
 Alter ego, or "alter" in popular usage, a "second self"
 Alter (SQL)
 Alter (album), 2002 album by Floater
 Alter, a 2006 remix album by Swiss band Knut
 "Alter", a song from the 1994 album Glow, by Raven

See also 
 Altar (disambiguation)